Lira BK  is a Swedish football club located in Luleå.

Background
Lira BK were founded in 1933 and for many years played in the lower part of the Swedish league pyramid. From 1995 until 1999 during the most successful period in the history of the club, the title Lira Luleå BK was used. The club played 3 seasons in Division 1 Norra during this period.  In 2000 the club voluntarily donated its place in Division 2 Norrland to Luleå Fotboll.

Lira BK  currently plays in Division 4 Norrbotten Norra which is the sixth tier of Swedish football. They play their home matches at the Porsö IP in Luleå.

The club is affiliated to Norrbottens Fotbollförbund. Lira is today Norrland's biggest football club with 3,000 members and 800 players aged 7 to 18 years old.

Season to season

In their most successful period Lira Luleå BK competed in the following divisions:

In recent seasons Lira BK have competed in the following divisions:

Attendances

In recent seasons Lira BK have had the following average attendances:

Footnotes

External links
 Lira BK  – Official website
  Lira BK  Facebook

Sport in Luleå
Football clubs in Norrbotten County
1933 establishments in Sweden
Association football clubs established in 1933